Pseudodrephalys sohni is commonly found in Amazonas, Brazil.

References
http://www.ftp.funet.fi/index/Tree_of_life/insecta/lepidoptera/ditrysia/hesperioidea/hesperiidae/pyrginae/pseudodrephalys/index.html#atinas
http://entomology.si.edu/StaffPages/BurnsJ.htm

Pyrgini
Taxa named by John Burns (entomologist)
Insects described in 1998
Lepidoptera of Brazil

fr:Pyrginae